Houston County High School (Tennessee), a.k.a. HCHS, is located just outside the county seat of Erin, Tennessee. It is one of four schools in the Houston County public school system and the only high school (grades 9–12).

HCHS's nickname is the Fighting Irish due to the areas rich Irish heritage.  School colors are Kelly Green and White.

Athletics include Marching Band, Basketball, Football, Baseball, Softball, Tennis, Golf & Volleyball (girls).

References

External links
School website
School Data

Educational institutions in the United States with year of establishment missing
Public high schools in Tennessee
Schools in Houston County, Tennessee